The  1971 Jakarta Anniversary Tournament was an association football tournament held from June 5 to 16 in Jakarta. Nine teams participated.

Teams 
  (Host Country)
 
 
 
 
 
  South Korea B

Stadium

First stage

Group A

Group B

Group B

Second Stage

Group A

Group Y 

after the final whistle, Thai players started a brawl which led to a six month suspension of the team by the FAT

Fifth Place 

not played, Thailand returned home after player brawl in last group match v Khmer.

Round of Semifinals

Semifinals

Third Place

Final

Winner

Post Tournament Friendlies

References
 The Straits Times article
 TEMPO article

1971
1971 in Indonesian sport
1971 in Asian football